Xenodermichthys is a small genus of slickheads. They have blank white eyes that look blind.

Species
There are currently two recognized species in this genus:
 Xenodermichthys copei (T. N. Gill, 1884) (Bluntsnout smooth-head)
 Xenodermichthys nodulosus Günther, 1878

References

Alepocephalidae
Taxa named by Albert Günther